Woodplumpton is a village and civil parish in the City of Preston, Lancashire, England, located  north of Preston.

Geography
It is part of the Fylde, a flat area of land between the Forest of Bowland and the Lancashire coast.

Community
The village contains a primary school, the Wheatsheaf pub and a church. The school is C of E and has a strong link with the church.

St Anne's Church is the location of the grave of Meg Shelton, the notorious Fylde Hag, who was buried there in 1705 after being accused of witchcraft.

Parish
The parish includes the villages of Eaves, Catforth and Lower Bartle. Higher Plumpton is also included in the parish, but like Lower Bartle, is a very small hamlet.

In the 19th century Woodplumpton was known as Plumpton-Wood.

The parish was part of Preston Rural District throughout its existence from 1894 to 1974. In 1974 the parish became part of the Borough of Preston, which became a city in 2002.

Demography
In 1901 the population of the parish was 1,208 and covered 4,970.5 acres.  In 2001 it had a population of 2,051, increasing to 2,154 at the 2011 Census.

Gallery

See also

Listed buildings in Woodplumpton

References

External links

Villages in Lancashire
Civil parishes in Lancashire
Geography of the City of Preston
The Fylde